Alwarthirunagar is an urban locality in Chennai, the capital city of Tamil Nadu, India. Alwarthirunagar Pin code is 600087 and postal head office is Valasaravakkam. It falls under Valasaravakkam municipality, in Maduravoyal (State Assembly Constituency) constituency in Tiruvallur district in the Indian state of Tamil Nadu. The word nagar refers to a settlement in sanskrit. The neighbourhood was developed by the City Lando Corporation in the late 1960s. With the opening of schools and shopping centres, Alwarthirunagar emerged as a service centre in Chennai's west. Twenty acres of forestation in the area acts against pollution. The area is traversed by state road number 113.

Neighbourhoods

Ramakrishna Nagar 
Ramakrishna Nagar is located in the centre of Alwarthirunagar. There, a large recreation area, developed in the 1980s, is used for playing cricket. However, in 2008, new constructions encroached on the area and flooding is a common problem during the rainy season.

Velan Nagar 
Velan Nagar is approximately 1 km from the Alwarthirunagar bus stop and about 800 m from the Lamech bus stop. During the late 1980s, Velan Nagar was affected by stagnating water during the rainy season. By the 1990s, the area had developed into a very large residential area, decreasing the number of parks and making cycling more difficult. There is a Banyan tree that is considered holy. The Ganesh temple in Velan Nagar has been renovated.

Palaniappa Nagar 
Palaniappa Nagar is adjacent to Alwarthirunagar with streets connecting from Arcot Road and Radhakrishnan Salai.

Meenakshi Amman Nagar 
Meenakshi Amman Nagar Alwarthirunagar, Chennai area its under taluk NA, district Tiruvallur and state TAMIL NADU. Meenakshi Amman Temple, Raamar Temple, Kadambadi Amman Temple, Pillayar Kovil that are near to  Meenakshi Amman Nagar Alwarthirunagar, Chennai,

Central business district 
The main commercial district is on Arcot road. There is a multi brand superstore, grocery stores, fast food outlets, a bakery and a library. There is also a Panchayat Union dispensary.

Schools 
 La Chatelaine Junior College

 St John's matriculation higher secondary school.
 Sri Venkateswara matriculation higher secondary school
 Lamech school

References 

Neighbourhoods in Chennai